Pyrausta perlalis is a moth in the family Crambidae. It is found in Ecuador.

References

perlalis
Moths of South America